Nerone is a 1977 Italian comedy film directed by Castellacci & Pingitore. It parodies real life event of the Roman emperor Nero.

Plot

Cast 
Pippo Franco as Nero 
Maria Grazia Buccella as Poppea 
Paola Tedesco as  Licia 
Oreste Lionello as Seneca 
Enrico Montesano as Petronio Arbitro 
Paola Borboni as Agrippina 
Gianfranco D'Angelo as  Tigellino 
Paolo Stoppa as  San Pietro 
Aldo Fabrizi as General Galba 
Bombolo as  Roscio  
Marina Marfoglia as  Atte 
Laura Troschel as  Locusta 
Massimo Dapporto as  Cristiano liberato 
Attilio Dottesio as  Centurione 
Giancarlo Magalli as  Presidente del senato 
Carmen Russo as  Lucilla

References

External links

1977 films
Italian comedy films
1977 comedy films
Films set in ancient Rome
Films set in the Roman Empire
Films directed by Pier Francesco Pingitore
Depictions of Nero on film
1970s Italian-language films
1970s Italian films
Cultural depictions of Seneca the Younger